Polonium tetraiodide is a binary inorganic compound of polonium and iodine with the chemical formula . The compound forms volatile black crystals.

Synthesis
1. Action of iodine vapor on polonium metal:
Po + 2I2 -> PoI4 

2. Dissolution of polonium dioxide in hydroiodic acid:
 PoO2 + 4HI -> PoI4 + 2H2O

Properties

Physical properties 
The compound forms black crystals that are insoluble in water.

Chemical properties
The compound reacts with hydroiodic acid to form hexaiodopolonic acid:
  PoI4 + 2HI -> H2[PoI6]

It can be reduced by hydrogen sulfide to yield polonium metal. It decomposes on heating.

References

Polonium compounds
Iodides